Carlos Melero (born 17 December 1948) is a Spanish former cyclist. He competed in the team time trial at the 1972 Summer Olympics. He rode in the Tour de France five times and the Vuelta a España four times.

References

External links
 

1948 births
Living people
Spanish male cyclists
Olympic cyclists of Spain
Cyclists at the 1972 Summer Olympics
Sportspeople from Valladolid
Cyclists from Castile and León
20th-century Spanish people
21st-century Spanish people